Laila Rouass (née Abdesselam) is a British actress. She is best known for her portrayals of Amber Gates in Footballers' Wives (2004–2006) and Sahira Shah in Holby City (2011–2012, 2021). She has also starred in Primeval and Spooks and been a contestant on Strictly Come Dancing, in which she finished fourth.

Career
Rouass worked as a VJ on Channel V in India in the 1990s. While on Channel V, she appeared in a music video for the band Colour Blind, directed by the then creative head of the channel, Shamin Desai.

After moving back to the UK, Rouass became famous for playing the role of Bollywood actress Amber Gates in the cult ITV1 series Footballers' Wives between 2004 and 2006 and, albeit briefly, on the ITV2 spin-off series Footballers' Wives: Extra Time. She also played recurring roles on the British soaps Family Affairs and Hollyoaks, as well as appearing in episodes of I Dream, Casualty and Meet the Magoons. She starred alongside Meera Syal in the television adaptation of Syal's novel, Life Isn't All Ha Ha Hee Hee.

Rouass was ranked No.87 and No.69 on FHM 100 Sexiest Women in the World 2004 and FHM 100 Sexiest Women in the World 2005 respectively.

In 2009 she appeared as Egyptologist Sarah Page in the third series of the ITV science-fiction series Primeval. She left the show when location of filming was changed to Dublin, for series four and five, saying it would be hard to continue participating as she was a single parent.

In spring of 2010, Rouass announced that she will be making a film about Leila Khaled, who led the hijacking of a flight from Rome to Athens in 1969. Rouass stated she had funding for the film.

She played Maya Lahan, a regular character introduced in the ninth series of BBC One drama Spooks which broadcast from September 2010. She guest starred as the evil Colonel Karim in The Sarah Jane Adventures in October 2010. Rouass then joined the cast of the BBC medical drama Holby City, appearing from February 2011 as registrar Sahira Shah. She left Holby City on 17 April 2012, after just 14 months on the show, to take a break to spend time with her family.  She returned to the role of Sahira Shah on 9 February 2021.

She is also currently one of the presenters of "The Channel 4 TV Book Club".

Strictly Come Dancing
She participated in the seventh series of Strictly Come Dancing, a BBC One reality show, paired with professional dancer Anton Du Beke, and alongside Footballers' Wives co-star Zöe Lucker.

The pair made it to the last four before being voted off the show on 6 December 2009. She did not attend the final on 19 December 2009 to reprise her partnership with Anton Du Beke.

Film career
Rouass' first film was City of Dreams produced by Feroze Nadiawala, in which she starred opposite Lisa Ray and Saeed Jaffery. During the years that she was based in India, early in her career, she acted in some Indian films, Aditya Bhattacharya's Indo-Italian Senso unico (1999) and Dev Benegal's Split Wide Open (1999).

In 2000, Rouass starred in Jag Mhundra's controversial film, Bawandar (English title; The Sand Storm), about revenge rapes in Rajasthan, and she made her English-language film debut in 2002 with a small role in The Four Feathers opposite Heath Ledger.

She starred in The Hunt Feast (2004), and in 2006 she was cast in Aditya Raj Kapoor's film Don't Stop Dreaming.

Rouass also appeared in the independent British film Shoot on Sight (2007) opposite Brian Cox, Om Puri and Sadie Frost. In 2008, she appeared in two films, Freebird and the New Zealand funded Apron Strings.

Rouass appeared in the Harlan Coben Netflix original 8 part mini-series Safe where she played Lauren Marshall.

Personal life 

Born Laila Abdesselam to an Indian mother and a Moroccan father, she grew up with six siblings in Tower Hamlets in the East End of London. Raised Muslim, she is now non-practising, although she calls the Islamic faith an important part of her identity. In 1990, she married family friend Abdeslam Rouass, but they divorced in 2003 without having consummated their marriage, after which Rouass lived with London businessman Nasir Khan. Khan and Rouass held a ceremony in 2005 before family and friends, pledging to spend their lives together; Rouass later faced criticism for referring to herself and Khan as having married each other, even though the ceremony had no legal standing. She became pregnant in 2006, but ended her relationship with Khan shortly after their daughter Inez was born in February 2007. In 2011, Khan was sentenced to nine years in prison for his money-laundering role in a £250 million VAT fraud conspiracy.

From 2010 to 2011, Rouass dated celebrity chef James Petrie. In 2012, she began dating professional snooker player Ronnie O'Sullivan, to whom she became engaged in February 2013. Rouass and O'Sullivan appeared together as guests on BBC's Saturday Kitchen in February 2021. In February 2022, Rouass announced on social media that the couple had ended their relationship, but they subsequently reconciled.

In August 2017, Rouass was caught up in the Barcelona terrorist attack, writing on Twitter during the incident that she was hiding in a restaurant freezer.

Filmography

Awards and nominations

References

External links 
 
 

English film actresses
English people of Moroccan descent
English television actresses
Living people
Actresses from London
English expatriates in India
Actresses in Hindi cinema
British expatriate actresses in India
European actresses in India
English soap opera actresses
British Muslims
21st-century British actresses
1971 births